Terminal Alvorada is a bus station in Barra da Tijuca in the West Zone of Rio de Janeiro. The terminal was renovated in 2013.

Services
The terminal is an integrated BRT station servicing the TransOeste and TransCarioca lines. The station is open 24 hours a day.

References

Bus stations in Brazil
TransCarioca
TransOeste
Transolímpica